Your Money or Your Life (Italian: O la borsa o la vita) is a 1932 Italian comedy film directed by Carlo Ludovico Bragaglia and starring Sergio Tofano, Rosetta Tofano and Luigi Almirante. It was made at the Cines Studios in Rome.

The film's art direction was by Gastone Medin.

Cast
Sergio Tofano as Daniele 
Rosetta Tofano as Renata 
Luigi Almirante as Giovanni Bensi 
Cesare Zoppetti as Tommaso 
Lamberto Picasso as Anarchic 
Mara Dussia as Lady with dog 
Mario Siletti
Mario Ferrari
Giovanni Lombardi
Eugenio Duse
Giovanni Ferrari
Mario De Bernardi

References

Bibliography
Moliterno, Gino. Historical Dictionary of Italian Cinema. Scarecrow Press, 2008. .

External links

Italian comedy films
1932 comedy films
Films directed by Carlo Ludovico Bragaglia
Italian black-and-white films
Cines Studios films
Films scored by Vittorio Rieti
1930s Italian-language films
1930s Italian films